Planet of the Apes is a 1968 American science fiction film directed by Franklin J. Schaffner from a screenplay by Michael Wilson and Rod Serling, loosely based on the 1963 novel of the same name by Pierre Boulle. The film stars Charlton Heston, Roddy McDowall, Kim Hunter, Maurice Evans, James Whitmore, James Daly, and Linda Harrison. In the film, an astronaut crew crash-lands on a strange planet in the distant future. Although the planet appears desolate at first, the surviving crew members stumble upon a society in which apes have evolved into creatures with human-like intelligence and speech. The apes have assumed the role of the dominant species and humans are mute creatures wearing animal skins.

The outline Planet of the Apes script, originally written by Serling, underwent many rewrites before filming eventually began. Directors J. Lee Thompson and Blake Edwards were approached, but the film's producer Arthur P. Jacobs, upon the recommendation of Heston, chose Franklin J. Schaffner to direct the film. Schaffner's changes included an ape society less advanced—and therefore less expensive to depict—than that of the original novel. Filming took place between May 21 and August 10, 1967, in California, Utah, and Arizona, with desert sequences shot in and around Lake Powell, Glen Canyon National Recreation Area. The film's final "closed" cost was $5.8 million.

Planet of the Apes premiered on February 8, 1968, at the Capitol Theatre in New York City, and was released in the United States on April 3, by 20th Century Fox. The film was a box-office hit, earning a lifetime domestic gross of $33.3 million. It was groundbreaking for its prosthetic makeup techniques by artist John Chambers and was well received by audiences and critics, being nominated for Best Costume Design and Best Original Score at the 41st Academy Awards, and winning a honorary Academy Award for Chambers. In 2001, Planet of the Apes was selected for preservation in the United States National Film Registry by the Library of Congress as being "culturally, historically, or aesthetically significant".

Planet of the Apes success launched a franchise, including four sequels, as well as a television series, animated series, comic books, and various merchandising. In particular, Roddy McDowall had a long-running relationship with the franchise, appearing in four of the original five films (he was absent from the second film, Beneath the Planet of the Apes, in which he was replaced by David Watson in the role of Cornelius) and also in the television series. The original film series was followed by Tim Burton's remake of the same name in 2001 and a reboot series, which began with Rise of the Planet of the Apes in 2011.

Plot

Astronauts Taylor, Landon, and Dodge awaken from deep hibernation after a near-light-speed space voyage. Stewart, the lone female crew member, is dead due to a sleep chamber malfunction caused by an air leak, the look of her remains prefiguring the survivors’ encounters with the apes.  Their spacecraft crashes into a lake on an unknown planet; Taylor's estimate places them in Orion's Bellatrix System, 300 light-years from their home Solar System. Before they abandon their sinking vessel, the three survivors read the ship's chronometer as November 25, 3978 – two thousand and six years after their departure in 1972. However, due to time dilation, the astronauts themselves have aged slightly less than one year.

The men travel through desolate wasteland, coming across eerie scarecrow-like figures and a freshwater lake with lush vegetation. While swimming, the men's clothes are stolen and shredded by primitive mute humans. Soon after, armed gorillas raid a cornfield where the humans are gathering food. Taylor is shot in the throat as he and the others are captured. Dodge is killed and Landon rendered unconscious in the chaos. Taylor is taken to Ape City. Two chimpanzees, animal psychologist Zira and surgeon Galen, save Taylor's life, though his throat injury renders him temporarily mute.

Taylor is placed with a captive female, whom he later names Nova. He observes an advanced society of talking apes with a strict caste system: gorillas are the military force and laborers; orangutans oversee government and religion; and intellectual chimpanzees are mostly scientists and doctors. The ape society is a theocracy, while the apes consider the primitive humans as vermin to be hunted and either killed outright, enslaved, or used in scientific experiments. Taylor convinces Zira and her fiancé, Cornelius, that he is as intelligent as they are; one way by making a paper airplane. Dr. Zaius, their orangutan superior, arranges for Taylor to be castrated against Zira's protests. Taylor escapes and finds Dodge's stuffed corpse on display in a museum. He is soon recaptured, in the process revealing that he can speak, which alarms the apes.

A hearing to determine Taylor's origins is convened. Taylor mentions his two comrades, learning that Landon was lobotomized and rendered catatonic. Believing Taylor either is from an unknown human tribe beyond their borders or was the subject of a mad scientist who gave him the power of speech, Zaius privately threatens to castrate and lobotomize Taylor for refusing to reveal his origins. With help from Zira's nephew Lucius, Zira and Cornelius free Taylor and Nova and take them to the Forbidden Zone, a taboo region outside Ape City where Taylor's ship crashed. Ape law has ruled the area out of bounds for centuries. Cornelius and Zira are intent to gather proof of an earlier non-simian civilization – which Cornelius discovered a year earlier – to be cleared of heresy; Taylor focuses on proving he comes from a different planet.

When the group arrives at the cave, Cornelius is intercepted by Zaius and his soldiers. Taylor holds them off by threatening to shoot Zaius, who agrees to enter the cave to disprove their theories. Inside, Cornelius displays remnants of a technologically advanced human society pre-dating simian history. Taylor identifies artifacts such as dentures, eyeglasses, a heart valve...and, to the apes' astonishment, a talking human doll. Zaius admits he has always known about the ancient human civilization. Taylor wants to search for answers. Zaius warns Taylor against finding an answer which he does not like, adding that the now-desolate Forbidden Zone was once a lush paradise. After Taylor and Nova are allowed to leave, Zaius has the cave sealed off to destroy the evidence, while charging Zira, Cornelius, and Lucius with heresy.

Taylor and Nova follow the shoreline on horseback. Eventually, they discover the remnants of the Statue of Liberty, revealing that this supposedly alien planet is actually Earth, long after an apocalyptic nuclear war. Understanding Zaius' earlier warning while Nova looks on in shock, Taylor falls to his knees in despair, condemning humanity for destroying the world.

Cast

 Charlton Heston as George Taylor

 Roddy McDowall as Dr. Cornelius
 Kim Hunter as Dr. Zira
 Maurice Evans as Dr. Zaius
 James Whitmore as President of the Assembly
 James Daly as Dr. Honorius

 Linda Harrison as Nova

 Robert Gunner as Landon
 Lou Wagner as Lucius
 Woodrow Parfrey as Dr. Maximus
 Jeff Burton as Dodge
 Buck Kartalian as Julius
 Norman Burton as Hunt Leader
 Wright King as Dr. Galen
 Paul Lambert as Minister
 Dianne Stanley as Stewart

Production

Origins
Producer Arthur P. Jacobs bought the rights for the Pierre Boulle novel before its publication in 1963. Jacobs pitched the production to many studios, and in late 1964, the project was announced as a Warner Brothers production, with Blake Edwards attached to direct. After Jacobs made a successful debut as a producer doing What a Way to Go! (1964) for 20th Century Fox and begun pre-production of another movie for the studio, Doctor Dolittle, he managed to convince Fox vice-president Richard D. Zanuck to greenlight Planet of the Apes.

One script that came close to being made was written by The Twilight Zone creator Rod Serling, though it was finally rejected for a number of reasons. A prime concern was cost, as the technologically advanced ape society portrayed by Serling's script would have involved expensive sets, props, and special effects. The previously blacklisted screenwriter Michael Wilson was brought in to rewrite Serling's script and, as suggested by director Franklin J. Schaffner, the ape society was made more primitive as a way of reducing costs. Serling's stylized twist ending was retained, and became one of the most famous movie endings of all time. The exact location and state of decay of the Statue of Liberty changed over several storyboards. One version depicted the statue buried up to its nose in the middle of a jungle while another depicted the statue in pieces.

To convince the Fox Studio that a Planet of the Apes film could be made, the producers shot a brief test scene from a Rod Serling draft of the script, using early versions of the ape makeup, on March 8, 1966. Charlton Heston appeared as an early version of Taylor (named Thomas, as he was in the Serling-penned drafts), Edward G. Robinson appeared as Zaius, while two then-unknown Fox contract actors, James Brolin and Linda Harrison, played Cornelius and Zira. Harrison, who was at the time the girlfriend of studio chief Richard D. Zanuck, went on to be cast as Nova. Jacobs had at first considered Ursula Andress, then screen tested Angelique Pettyjohn, and even considered doing an international talent search for the role before Harrison's casting. Robinson wound up not joining the cast due to his declining health.

Michael Wilson's rewrite kept the basic structure of Serling's screenplay but rewrote all the dialogue and set the script in a more primitive society. According to associate producer Mort Abrahams an additional uncredited writer (his only recollection was that the writer's last name was Kelly) polished the script, rewrote some of the dialogue and included some of the more heavy-handed tongue-in-cheek dialogue ("I never met an ape I didn't like") which wasn't in either Serling or Wilson's drafts. According to Abrahams, some scenes, such as the one where the judges imitate the "see no evil, speak no evil and hear no evil" monkeys, were improvised on the set by director Franklin J. Schaffner and kept in the final film because of the audience reaction during test screenings prior to release. During filming John Chambers, who designed prosthetic make-up in the film, held training sessions at 20th Century-Fox studios, where he mentored other make-up artists of the film.

Filming

Filming began on May 21, 1967, and wrapped on August 10. Most of the early scenes of a desert-like terrain were shot in northern Arizona near the Grand Canyon, the Colorado River, Lake Powell, Glen Canyon and other locations near Page, Arizona Most scenes of the ape village, interiors and exteriors, were filmed on the Fox Ranch in Malibu Creek State Park, northwest of Los Angeles, essentially the backlot of 20th Century Fox. Reaching the beach on foot was virtually impossible, so cast, crew, film equipment, and even horses had to be lowered in by helicopter.

The remains of the Statue of Liberty were shot in a secluded cove on the far eastern end of Westward Beach, between Zuma Beach and Point Dume in Malibu. As noted in the documentary Behind the Planet of the Apes, the special effect shot of the half-buried statue was achieved by seamlessly blending a matte painting with existing cliffs. The shot looking down at Taylor was done from a  scaffold, angled over a -scale papier-mache model of the Statue. The actors in Planet of the Apes were so affected by their roles and wardrobe that, when not shooting, they automatically segregated themselves with the species they were portraying.

At one point, it was decided that Nova was pregnant, and scenes were filmed around the Page locations revealing Nova's pregnancy. In the penultimate drafts of Planet of the Apes, Taylor was killed by the bullet of an ape sniper while Nova, pregnant with Taylor's child, escaped and vanished into the Forbidden Zone. Although Harrison believed it was Heston who rejected the idea of Nova's pregnancy, those scenes were deleted, according to screenwriter Michael Wilson, "at the insistence of a high-echelon Fox executive who found it distasteful. Why? I suppose that, if one defines the mute Nova as merely "humanoid" and not actually human, it would mean that Taylor had committed sodomy." It was also decided that Nova's pregnancy would detract from the film's ending. In any case, all Harrison's scenes with Heston and Hunter in the sequence of Nova's pregnancy were cut. "There's probably a great deal of footage of it somewhere."

Reception

Critical response
Planet of the Apes was met with critical acclaim and is widely regarded as a classic. It was rated one of the best films of 1968, applauded for its imagination and its commentary on a possible world turned upside down. Pauline Kael called it "one of the most entertaining science-fiction fantasies ever to come out of Hollywood." Roger Ebert of the Chicago Sun-Times gave the film three stars out of four and called it "much better than I expected it to be. It is quickly paced, completely entertaining, and its philosophical pretensions don't get in the way." Renata Adler of The New York Times wrote, "It is no good at all, but fun, at moments, to watch." Arthur D. Murphy of Variety called it "an amazing film." He thought the script "at times digresses into low comedy," but "the totality of the film works very well." Kevin Thomas of the Los Angeles Times wrote, "A triumph of artistry and imagination, it is at once a timely parable and a grand adventure on an epic scale." Richard L. Coe of The Washington Post called it an "amusing and unusually engrossing picture."

, the film has a "Certified Fresh" 87% rating on the review aggregate website Rotten Tomatoes, based on 60 reviews with an average rating of 7.60/10. The website's critical consensus reads, "Planet of the Apes raises thought-provoking questions about our culture without letting social commentary get in the way of the drama and action." In 2008, the film was selected by Empire magazine as one of The 500 Greatest Movies of All Time.

Box office
According to Fox records the film required $12,850,000 in theater rentals to break even and made $20,825,000a large profit for the studio.

Accolades
The film won an honorary Academy Award for John Chambers for his outstanding make-up achievement. The film was nominated for Best Costume Design (Morton Haack) and Best Original Score for a Motion Picture (not a Musical) (Jerry Goldsmith). The score is known for its avant-garde compositional techniques, as well as the use of unusual percussion instruments and extended performance techniques, as well as his 12-tone music (the violin part using all 12 chromatic notes) to give an eerie, unsettled feel to the planet, mirroring the sense of placelessness.

American Film Institute Lists
 AFI's 100 Years...100 Movies—Nominated
 AFI's 100 Years...100 Thrills—#59
 AFI's 100 Years...100 Heroes and Villains:
 Colonel George Taylor—Nominated Hero
 AFI's 100 Years...100 Movie Quotes:
 "Take your stinking paws off me, you damned dirty ape!"—#66
 AFI's 100 Years of Film Scores—#18
 AFI's 100 Years...100 Movies (10th Anniversary Edition)—Nominated
 AFI's 10 Top 10—Nominated Science Fiction Film

National Film Registry

Among the 25 Films inducted into the Library of Congress for the year 2001.

Legacy

Original series sequels
Writer Rod Serling was brought back to work on an outline for a sequel. Serling's outline was ultimately discarded in favor of a story by associate producer Mort Abrahams and writer Paul Dehn, which became the basis for Beneath the Planet of the Apes. The original film series had four sequels:
 Beneath the Planet of the Apes (1970)
 Escape from the Planet of the Apes (1971)
 Conquest of the Planet of the Apes (1972)
 Battle for the Planet of the Apes (1973)

Television series
 Planet of the Apes (1974)
 Return to the Planet of the Apes (animated) (1975)

Remake
 Planet of the Apes (2001): The film was a re-imagining of the original film, directed by Tim Burton.

Reboot series
 Rise of the Planet of the Apes (2011): A series reboot, directed by Rupert Wyatt, was released on August 5, 2011 to critical and commercial success. It is the first installment in the new series of films.
 Dawn of the Planet of the Apes (2014): The second entry in the Planet of the Apes reboot series, directed by Matt Reeves, was released on July 11, 2014.
 War for the Planet of the Apes (2017): The third film in the reboot series, directed by Matt Reeves, was released on July 14, 2017.
 Kingdom of the Planet of the Apes (2024): The upcoming fourth entry in the Planet of the Apes reboot series, directed by Wes Ball. It will be released on May 24, 2024.

Documentaries
 Behind the Planet of the Apes (1998) A feature-length making-of documentary on the original film and TV series, hosted by Roddy McDowall.

Comics
 Comic book adaptations of the films were published by Gold Key (1970) and Marvel Comics (b/w magazine 1974–1977, color comic book 1975–76). Malibu Comics reprinted the Marvel adaptations when it held the license in the early 1990s, as well as producing new stories including Ape Nation, a crossover with Alien Nation. Dark Horse Comics published an adaptation for the 2001 Tim Burton film. Currently Boom! Studios has the licensing rights to Planet of the Apes. Its stories tell the tale of Ape City and its inhabitants before Taylor arrived. In July 2014, Boom! Studios and IDW Publishing published a crossover between Planet of the Apes and the original Star Trek series. In 2018, the original 1968 film's unused screenplay by Rod Serling was adapted into a graphic novel entitled Planet of the Apes: Visionaries.

In popular culture
A parody of the film series titled "The Milking of the Planet That Went Ape" was published in Mad Magazine. It was illustrated by Mort Drucker and written by Arnie Kogen in regular issue #157, March 1973.

The cartoon The Fairly Oddparents "Magic Muffin" Special has Timmy Turner and his archenemy Crocker ending up in a future Earth where Apes are the Masters and Humans are slaves

TV Globo, Brazil's largest and most important television network (and the second-largest commercial TV network in the world just behind the American ABC TV), aired from 1976 to 1982 a sketch comedy show called Planeta dos Homens (Planet of the Men) where, among regular sketches and parodies, three apes (Charles, a chimp, Socrates and Gibinha, orangutans) from a highly-evolved ape planet, tried to comprehend the illogical human civilization, ending with the catchphrase: "You don't need to explain me, I just wanted to understand it!" Planeta dos Homens went on for years as one of the highest-audience levels TV shows in the country.

Gallery

See also
 List of American films of 1968
 Apocalyptic and post-apocalyptic fiction, about the film genre, with a list of related films
 Survival film, about the film genre, with a list of related films

References

External links

 Planet of the Apes essay   by John Wills at the National Film Registry
 
 
 
 
 
 
 
 Planet of the Apes essay by Daniel Eagan in America's Film Legacy: The Authoritative Guide to the Landmark Movies in the National Film Registry, A&C Black, 2010 , pages 632–633 

1960s dystopian films
1968 films
1960s English-language films
1960s science fiction films
American science fiction adventure films
American dystopian films
Films about apes
Films about astronauts
Films about time travel
Films awarded an Academy Honorary Award
Films based on French novels
Films directed by Franklin J. Schaffner
Films scored by Jerry Goldsmith
Films set in New York City
Fiction set in the 4th millennium
Films set in the future
Films shot in Utah
Films shot in Arizona
Post-apocalyptic fiction
Films shot in California
Planet of the Apes films
Films with screenplays by Michael Wilson (writer)
Films with screenplays by Rod Serling
United States National Film Registry films
20th Century Fox films
Films based on science fiction novels
Statue of Liberty in fiction
1960s American films